The AFC Fourth Round of 2006 FIFA World Cup qualification was held on 8 and 12 October 2005 between the two teams that finished third in the third round.

The winning team advanced to a play-off against the fourth-placed team of the CONCACAF qualifying group, Trinidad and Tobago. The winner of this play-off will qualify for the 2006 World Cup finals.

The first leg was originally played on 3 September 2005 but the match was ordered to be replayed by FIFA after a refereeing mistake. With Uzbekistan leading the tie 1–0, a penalty was awarded to them but the referee disallowed the resulting goal and offered an indirect free kick to Bahrain for encroachment. Uzbekistan had formally requested for the match to be recorded as an automatic 3–0 victory.

Summary

Matches

1–1 on aggregate. Bahrain won on away goals and advanced to the CONCACAF–AFC play-off.

Notes

References

4
Qual
2005 in Uzbekistani football
2005–06 in Bahraini football
2005
2005